is a Japanese footballer who plays as a full back for  club Shimizu S-Pulse.

National team career
In August 2007, Yoshida was elected Japan U-17 national team for 2007 U-17 World Cup. He played full time in all 3 matches as left side-back.

Club statistics
.

Honours
Nagoya Grampus
J.League Cup: 2021

References

External links
Profile at Sagan Tosu

1990 births
Living people
People from Fujinomiya, Shizuoka
Association football people from Shizuoka Prefecture
Japanese footballers
Japan youth international footballers
J1 League players
J2 League players
Ventforet Kofu players
Shimizu S-Pulse players
Sagan Tosu players
Nagoya Grampus players
Association football defenders